Francesc Xavier Eritja i Ciuró (born 26 March 1970) is a Spanish historian and politician from Catalonia who serves as Member of the Congress of Deputies of Spain.

Early life
Eritja was born on 26 March 1970 in Sallent, Catalonia. He has a degree in history from the University of Barcelona, a degree in medieval history from the University of Toulouse and a postgraduate qualification in culturalm management from the University of Lleida.

Career
Eritja worked for the Catalan health service's administrative planning unit.

Eritja is a member of the Catalan National Assembly, Òmnium Cultural and Ateneu Popular de Ponent. He contested the 2015 general election as a Republican Left of Catalonia–Catalonia Yes (ERC–CatSí) electoral alliance candidate in the Province of Lleida and was elected to the Congress of Deputies. He was re-elected at the 2016 and 2019 general elections.

Electoral history

References

External links

1970 births
Living people
Members of the 11th Congress of Deputies (Spain)
Members of the 12th Congress of Deputies (Spain)
Members of the 13th Congress of Deputies (Spain)
People from Bages
People from Lleida
Republican Left of Catalonia politicians
University of Barcelona alumni
University of Lleida alumni
University of Toulouse alumni
Members of the 14th Congress of Deputies (Spain)